Rotta may refer to:

 Rotta, Germany, a small village in Saxony-Anhalt
La Rotta, Pontedera, a village in Tuscany, Italy
 Rotta, The Netherlands, an early and high medieval settlement on the river Rotte and the predecessor of the current Dutch city of Rotterdam.
 Rotta (composition), a 16th and 17th century music composition for brass instruments
 Rotta (instrument), a musical instrument of 6th-century Germany
 Rotta the Huttlet, a character in the animated film The Clone Wars
 chapati, a type of flatbread found in India.

People with the surname
 Amilcare Rotta (1911–1981), Italian bobsledder 
 Angelo Rotta (1872–1965) Italian prelate of the Catholic Church 
 Antonio Rotta (1828-1903), Italian painter
 Notkea Rotta, Finnish rapper
 René Rotta (1928–2007), French racing cyclist
 Rudy Rotta (1950—2017), Swiss-Italian blues guitarist and vocalist

See also
Rota (disambiguation)